Bahri Omari (10 February 188914 April 1945) was an Albanian politician, publisher, and writer.

Early life
Born on 10 February 1889, in the city of Gjirokastër, Janina Vilayet, Ottoman Empire (today Albania), he became at the age of 25 the prefect of Himarë, a coastal town in southern Albania and later fought against the Greek Army during the Greek Occupation of Albania.

Career
In 1914, Omari moved to the United States where he became editor of the Albanian language newspaper Dielli which was published by the Vatra Organization. He returned to Albania five years later and participated twice in the parliamentary elections of 1921 and 1923, representing the party of Mufid Libohova. In 1924, during Fan Noli's government, he was elected general secretary of the National Democrat Party and was in charge of its printed medium, "Shekulli".

After Noli's exile caused by Ahmet Zogu's coup d'état in December, 1924, Omari migrated to Italy and lived there until 1939. Following his return to Albania, in 1942 he became a member of the Balli Kombëtar movement. During the occupation of Albania by Nazi Germany, he was appointed Minister of Foreign Affairs. For holding this post, he was arrested and put on trial at the Special Court of 1945, organized by Koçi Xoxe and Enver Hoxha, his brother-in-law. He was executed by firing squad on April 14, 1945.

See also
Communism in Albania
June Revolution

References

1880s births
1945 deaths
People from Gjirokastër
People from Janina vilayet
Albanian collaborators with Nazi Germany
Albanian diplomats
Albanian expatriates in the United States
Albanian people executed by the communist regime
Government ministers of Albania
Foreign ministers of Albania
20th-century executions by Albania
People executed by Albania by firing squad
Mekteb-i Mülkiye alumni
Executed Albanian collaborators with Nazi Germany